Imagery is a literary technique.

Imagery may also refer to:
 Imagery (album), a 1997 album by death-metal band Neuraxis
 Imagery (sculpture), sculpture focused in religious topics

See also
 Image
 Images (disambiguation)